Trachelophora Maculosa

Trachelophora is a genus of longhorn beetles of the subfamily Lamiinae, containing the following species:

 Trachelophora affinis Breuning, 1982
 Trachelophora curvicollis Perroud, 1855
 Trachelophora lineata Aurivillius, 1923
 Trachelophora maculosa Aurivillius, 1923
 Trachelophora niasica Aurivillius, 1923

References

Homonoeini